Jonathan Damián Iglesias Abreu (born 17 December 1988) is a Uruguayan professional footballer who plays as a midfielder for Ligue 2 club Paris FC.

Career
On 31 January 2017, Iglesias signed a contract with Clermont until the end of the 2016–17 season. On 3 January 2022, he signed for Paris FC on a contract until June 2023.

Career statistics

References

Living people
1988 births
Association football midfielders
Uruguayan footballers
Uruguayan Primera División players
Ligue 1 players
Ligue 2 players
Championnat National 3 players
Racing Club de Montevideo players
C.A. Rentistas players
El Tanque Sisley players
AS Nancy Lorraine players
Clermont Foot players
Paris FC players
Uruguayan expatriate footballers
Expatriate footballers in France
Uruguayan expatriate sportspeople in France
Footballers from Montevideo